Columbus Pride (or Stonewall Columbus Pride Parade) is an LGBTQ festival in Columbus, Ohio hosted by Stonewall Columbus. The event first took place in 1981, and has grown into the second largest LGBT pride event in the Midwest, behind Chicago. In 2014, Stonewall Columbus estimated over 300,000 participants. By 2018, the event rivaled Chicago in attendance. In 2019, Columbus Pride hosted about 500,000 people, making it the city's largest pride festival to date.

The pride parades typically include marching bands, firetrucks, motorcycles, and floats covered in rainbow flags or balloons.

The first pride parade in the city took place in 1981, drawing 200 people. Several of the attendees were afraid of marching so publicly, and so wore bags over their heads. Early parades in Columbus were marred by anti-LGBTQ protests, including in 1983, with demonstrators attributing AIDS to homosexuality (among marchers' calls to fund more AIDS research). In 1999, two protesters tore down a pride flag from the Ohio Statehouse and burned it. The two were charged with riot and disorderly conduct and criminal damaging. One of the two returned in 2001 to burn another pride flag during Columbus Pride.

The parade hosted LGBT activist celebrity George Takei in 2014 and Jim Obergefell, of Obergefell v. Hodges, in 2015. During the COVID-19 pandemic, the 2020 parade was postponed and ultimately canceled, with organizers moving to virtual events that took place later in the year.

References

External links
 

1981 establishments in Ohio
Culture of Columbus, Ohio
Festivals in Ohio
LGBT events in Ohio
Recurring events established in 1981
Events in Columbus, Ohio